Tim Shiel is an Australian radio announcer and electronic musician, best known for hosting the radio shows Something More on Triple J, and Arvos on Double J. Shiel has been releasing music since 2005 and has been used for film, television, advertising and award-winning video games. As a producer, mix engineer and consultant he has worked with artists including Flight Facilities, Planète, Georgia Fields, Hachiku, Braille Face, Huntly, Ben Abraham and Wrabel.

Career 
Shiel's radio career started on 3RRR in 2008.

In 2012, Shiel performed internationally as a multi-instrumentalist in the touring band for Gotye. 

In 2013, Shiel composed the music for the video game, Duet.

In 2014, Shiel established the record label Spirit Level in partnership with Gotye (Wally De Backer) to support the Australian release of Zammuto's album, Anchor.

In 2015, Shiel performed the Duet soundtrack live accompanied by the Queensland Symphony Orchestra.

In 2017, Shiel composed the music for the video game, Induction.  

Shiel hosts radio shows Something More, which is broadcast on Triple J and Arvos on Double J.

In 2021 Sheil collaborated with Mindy Meng Wang, Chinese/Australian composer and player of the ancient Chinese instrument, the guzheng (or Chinese zither). They released a single, "Hidden Qi 隐.气" in February, followed by an EP, Nervous Energy 一 触即发 in March of that year.

Discography

Albums

Extended plays

Awards and nominations

Music Victoria Awards
The Music Victoria Awards are an annual awards night celebrating Victorian music. They commenced in 2006.

! 
|-
| 2022
| Tim Shiel
| Best Producer
| 
| 
|-

References 

Living people
Australian musicians
Year of birth missing (living people)